Witton may refer to one of several places in England:

Witton, historic name of an area of Northwich, Cheshire
Witton Albion F.C.
Witton Gilbert, County Durham
Witton-le-Wear, County Durham
Witton, an area of Blackburn, Lancashire
Witton, Broadland, Norfolk, in the civil parish of Postwick with Witton, 5 miles (8 km) east of Norwich
Witton, North Norfolk, Norfolk, near North Walsham, 19 miles (30 km) north of Norwich
Witton, Birmingham, West Midlands
Witton, historic name of East Witton, North Yorkshire
Witton, historic name of West Witton, North Yorkshire

People
George Witton (1874-1942), Australian soldier in the Boer War
Hannah Witton (born 1992), English YouTuber and writer 
Henry Buckingham Witton (1831-1921), Canadian painter and political figure
 Mark P. Witton, British vertebrate palaeontologist
 Richard Witton (1423/4–1428), Master of University College, Oxford

See also
 Whitton (disambiguation)
Witton Park, County Durham
Witton Country Park, Blackburn
 Wyton (disambiguation)